Jacques Deval (1895–1972) was a French playwright, screenwriter and film director.

Novels
Marie Galante (1931)

Plays
Une faible femme; a comedy in three acts (1920)
Dans sa candeur naïve; a comedy in three acts (1926); translated into English as Her Cardboard Lover (1927), Valerie Wyngate and P.G. Wodehouse
Étienne; a play in three acts (1930)
Mademoiselle; a comedy in three acts (1932)
Tovarich; a play in four acts (1933)
Marie Galante; a play with music in two acts, based on the novel Marie Galante. Music by Kurt Weill (1934)
Soubrette; a comedy in three acts (1938)
Oh, Brother!; a comedy in three acts (1945)
La Femme de ta jeunesse; a play in three acts (1947)
Le Rayon des jouets; a comedy in three acts (1951)
La Prétentaine; a comedy in two acts (1957)
Romancero; a play in three acts (1958)

Filmography
 The Cardboard Lover, directed by Robert Z. Leonard (1928, based on the play Dans sa candeur naïve) 
 The Passionate Plumber, directed by Edward Sedgwick (1932, based on the play Dans sa candeur naïve) 
 A Weak Woman, directed by Max de Vaucorbeil (France, 1933, based on the play Une faible femme) 
 Étienne, directed by Jean Tarride (France, 1933, based on the play Étienne) 
 Journal of a Crime, directed by William Keighley (1934, remake of the 1933 film Une vie perdue) 
 Marie Galante, directed by Henry King (1934, based on the novel Marie Galante) 
 Tovaritch, directed by Jacques Deval (France, 1935, based on the play Tovaritch) 
 Tovarich, directed by Anatole Litvak (1937, based on the play Tovaritch) 
 Say It in French, directed by Andrew L. Stone (1938, based on the play Soubrette) 
 Her Cardboard Lover, directed by George Cukor (1942, based on the play Dans sa candeur naïve) 
 Una vírgen moderna, directed by Joaquín Pardavé (Mexico, 1946, based on the play Mademoiselle) 
 Miss Tatlock's Millions, directed by Richard Haydn (1948, based on the play Oh, Brother!) 
 Tuesday's Guest, directed by Jacques Deval (France, 1950, based on the play La Femme de ta jeunesse) 
 Women's Club, directed by Ralph Habib (France, 1956, remake of the 1936 film Women's Club) 
 , directed by Steno (Italy, 1961, based on the play Le Rayon des jouets) 
 Geliebte Hochstaplerin, directed by Ákos Ráthonyi (West Germany, 1961, based on the play La Prétentaine) 
 L'altra metà del cielo, directed by Franco Rossi (Italy, 1977, based on the play Romancero)

Screenwriter 
 Le Mauvais Garçon, directed by Henri Diamant-Berger (France, 1923) 
 Jenny Lind, directed by Arthur Robison (French, 1932) 
 Une vie perdue, directed by Raymond Rouleau (France, 1933)
 Women's Club, directed by Jacques Deval (France, 1936) 
 Cafe Metropole, directed by Edward H. Griffith (1937)
 Domenica, directed by Maurice Cloche (France, 1952) 
 When You Read This Letter, directed by Jean-Pierre Melville (France, 1953)

Notes

References

Sources

External links

1895 births
1972 deaths
20th-century French screenwriters
20th-century French dramatists and playwrights
French film directors
Writers from Paris